Leigh Carlson (born 15 January 1958) is a former Australian rules footballer who played for Collingwood and Fitzroy in the VFL.

Carlson started and ended his career at Victorian Football Association club Preston but in between played seven seasons in the VFL. His first stop was Collingwood where he was used mainly on the wing and as a rover. He played in their losing 1979 and 1980 Grand  Final sides and during the 1981 season crossed to Fitzroy. In a rare period of success for Fitzroy he contested the finals with the club in 1981, 1983 and 1984.

References

Holmesby, Russell and Main, Jim (2007). The Encyclopedia of AFL Footballers. 7th ed. Melbourne: Bas Publishing.

1958 births
Living people
Australian rules footballers from Victoria (Australia)
Collingwood Football Club players
Fitzroy Football Club players
Preston Football Club (VFA) players